Heptanema is an extinct genus of prehistoric coelacanth from the Middle Triassic (Ladinian) of northern Italy and Switzerland.

The type and only species is Heptanema paradoxum. Woodward (1891) suggested that Coelacanthus minor could be a species of Heptanema.

See also

 Sarcopterygii
 List of sarcopterygians
 List of prehistoric bony fish

References

Prehistoric lobe-finned fish genera